The 2021 attack on Tbilisi Pride was a violent counter-demonstration by far-right protesters against an attempt to hold a pride parade by pro-LGBT organizers of the NGO Tbilisi Pride in Tbilisi, Georgia. Anti-LGBT protesters frustrated attempts to hold a parade, attacked dozens of journalists who were covering the events and NGO offices, which resulted in the canceling of the Pride demonstration after four location changes from the initial procession at Rustaveli Avenue.

The protest held in support of Tbilisi Pride by a number of media outlets and political parties on the second day was also met by violent counter-protests.

Background
On 16 May 2021, a day ahead of International Day Against Homophobia, Transphobia and Biphobia, 15 political parties, including the United National Movement, the largest opposition party, signed the agreement "to fight to eliminate discrimination and violence against LGBTQ citizens with all mechanisms at their disposal" with Tbilisi Pride. The Tbilisi Pride described it as a "historical agreement in Georgia on LGBTQI rights."

On 4 June Tbilisi Pride announced "Pride Week" to take place during 1–5 July, consisting of three main events: Public screening of the March for Dignity, a British documentary film, featuring events around the first Tbilisi Pride, an open-air Pride Fest and March for Dignity on 5 July as the conclusive event for the Pride week. The Tbilisi Pride activists said that during the events they will demand "the implementation of a human-oriented policy by the government, fulfilment of all international obligations to ensure the environment free from homophobia and discrimination, to investigate hate crimes and ensure the safety and freedom of expression of each citizen of the country". Shame Movement, which was founded in consequence of the 2019 Gavrilov protests by opposition activists to demand resignation of the Georgian Dream government, and other political organizations announced that they will join the Pride Week.
	
On 15 June conservative political figure Levan Vasadze, who recently has founded the public movement ERI, urged government to cancel the Pride events to "prevent destabilisation". He stated that Tbilisi Pride events and march on Rustaveli Avenue in central Tbilisi on 5 July will not take place anyway because people will gather there and will not allow the "anti-Christian and anti-Georgian activities".

On 17 June the head of the ruling Georgian Dream party Irakli Kobakhidze said that "considering the current situation in the country and the context", holding the Pride events is "unreasonable". He also added that it is his own personal view.

On 24 June up to 30 conservative and Christian groups at the Hotel Gino Wellness in Mtskheta held briefing, where they announced that "the agreement was signed between national forces to mobilize against the Pride march and block the Rustaveli Avenue". The agreement was joined by public movement ERI, Alt-Info, Georgian Mission, Georgian Idea, NGO Mamulishvilebi, Society of Chokhosans, Movement for the National Media, pedagogical association Education and Ethics, business association Solidarity, and society Davitiani. Activist and political commentator of Alt-Info Zurab Makharadze announced the mutual statement of all parties which joined the agreement. He asserted that the Pride Week is directed against the moral basis of Georgian society, targeting future generations with an intent of destructing prevalent cultural and moral norms. Makharadze postulated that the political elites have betrayed "the values and the will of the people" by "becoming LGBT activists themselves", alluding to the memorandum signed by the 15 opposition parties in May with Tbilisi Pride and anti-discrimination law initiated and enacted by the ruling party Georgian Dream. Since its the sovereign decision of Georgian people to choose what kind of cultural politics they will pursue, he urged the government to follow the will of the absolute majority of population instead of enforcing "foreign directives like the foreign-imposed colonial administration".

Embassies of the European Union, United Kingdom and United States, among others, urged the government of Georgia to enable the activists to carry out the Pride Week as planned. On June 28, in an open letter, 28 members of the European Parliament called upon Vakhtang Gomelauri, the Minister of Internal Affairs (MIA) to protect the Pride parade with the police force if necessary. The Speaker of the Georgian Parliament and the Georgian Dream member Kakha Kuchava said in the interview that "the state is obliged to protect the order, safety and freedom of expression", noting that law enforcement agencies must ensure that no violence takes place during the Pride Week and counter-protests. A day later Tbilisi Mayor and one of the leaders of the Georgian Dream Kakhi Kaladze has told the reporters that he considers holding the Pride Week inappropriate in general because "specific groups can misuse the situation on both sides", although "freedom of expression is protected in this country".

On 29 June Georgian Orthodox Church has issued statement calling members of European Parliament working group on LGBTQ issues and embassy heads in Georgia "to refrain from supporting and encouraging Tbilisi Pride". The GOC has also urged the Georgian government to prevent "the destabilization of the country and of public life". It said that Tbilisi Pride "propagates non-traditional way of life under disguise of human rights" and that Church deems "hatred and violence directed at anyone unacceptable, but also denounces pride of sin and attempt to influence other people". According to statement, activities of the Tbilisi Pride discredit Western values in Georgia, and it is necessary to confirm that European democracy doesn't goes against the way of life and religious feelings of majority of the population. Along with Georgian Orthodox Church, other religious organizations like Administration of All Muslims of Georgia, Great Synagogue of Tbilisi and Diocese of the Armenian Apostolic Orthodox Church in Georgia have expressed their opposition to the Pride Week.

On 1 July the first from 3 events planned in the framework of Pride Week took place. The screening of the movie featuring events around the first Tbilisi Pride attracted large number of protesters, although it was held "without any excesses". According to the MIA, 650 police officers were mobilized at the spot and 23 protesters were detained. Along with Tbilisi Pride and Shame Movement activists who were co-organizers of the Pride Week, diplomats from Britain, France, Germany, Israel, United States and other countries were also attending the screening of the movie. Tbilisi Pride reported that the U.S. Embassy representative was egged by one of the counter-protesters, which was later confirmed by media outlets.

On 3 July Patriarchate of Georgia has stated that "for our Church and our citizens, the blatant intervention of some embassies and members of the European Parliament into our social and spiritual life is disturbing and unacceptable. We think that this is beyond their competency", calling Christians to "hold a prayer service to the Most Holy Virgin" on July 5, a March for Dignity day, and avoid "deliberate provocations" in order that "peaceful protest of people is not transformed into violent confrontation".
 
On 4 July, a day before the March for Dignity, the chairman of Georgian March Irakli Shikhiashvili visited office of Tbilisi Pride to hand over a letter, but the door of the office was closed. Shikhiashvili announced willingness to discuss in civil form the events surrounding the Pride parade. He also encouraged the ambassadors that "they should not provoke or support a march which majority of Georgian traditional society opposes, because it will cause negative reaction". Later Sandro Bregadze, the leader of the Georgian March stated that his party had not participated in the protests.

On 4 July the Alliance of Patriots held demonstration on the American independence day calling the USA diplomatic corps to "respect the independence of Georgia like they respect their own" and abstain from intervening on the behalf of Tbilisi Pride in Georgian internal affairs. The chairman of the party Davit Tarkhan Mouravi claimed that "pseudoliberal organizations of the USA and EU" like USAID, the Biden administration, and the U.S. Department of State along with the Georgian Dream government, United National Movement and European Georgia are "subverting the Church". Tarkhan Mouravi quoted Donald Trump that Christianity is under siege across the world, calling Christians to band together. At the end he warned about the global conspiracy to create "a new breed of man" with no gender, nationality, faith or whatsoever.

Attack on Tbilisi Pride

The March for Dignity was announced by Tbilisi Pride as the conclusive event for the Pride Week. The rally was planned to be held at 6:00 p.m. on Rustaveli Avenue.

In parallel of the March for Dignity, two events were planned by its opponents. Georgian Orthodox Church has called for public prayer meeting at Kashveti Church at 5:00 p.m., while the conservative groups who signed the agreement to counter the parade intended to mobilize at 10:00 a.m. and block the Rustaveli Avenue, preventing the March for Dignity from taking place. Some Orthodox priests have also joined the counter-protests.

The counter-protesters gathered from early morning in the 9 April Garden. They moved near the parliament building, where the leaders of the counter-demonstration gave speech in front of the public. Counter-protesters destroyed the tents erected by the opposition political parties against the sitting government in the preceding months because those parties signed agreement on LGBT rights with Tbilisi Pride. They tore down the EU Flag, with Zurab Makharadze, one of the leading figures of the counter-protests, announcing that "the flag which was tore down will remain down until ambassadors come here and apologize for supporting pederasty", and erected the cross in front of the parliament, signifying that "laws in this country will be written in accordance with Christian morals".

The Prime Minister of Georgia, Irakli Gharibashvili repeatedly urged the LGBT rights activists to abstain from holding the March for Dignity, claiming it would lead to disorder. In a televised address, he again urged the activists to either choose one of the alternative locations suggested by the MIA, or not to go forward with the plan at all, calling it unreasonable. Gharibashvili warned that it would provoke negative reactions from a large segment of the Georgian population. He blamed the "radical opposition" and the ex-president in exile, Mikheil Saakashvili, for being behind the March in order to destabilize the country and cause chaos. On the other hand, the MIA issued an official statement, saying that they regarded holding the March in a public space as too risky and asked them to refrain from it, or cancel the event altogether. The claims were later reasserted by the chairman of Georgian Dream and the former Speaker of Georgian Parliament, Irakli Kobakhidze.

At about noon, far-right protesters entered and ransacked the abandoned office of Tbilisi Pride and Shame Movement organizers. Media representatives, who remained in the office covering the events, were assaulted by the anti-LGBT protestors. One of the journalists, TV Pirveli cameraman Lekso Lashkarava, was found dead at his home a few days later. Lashkarava sustained serious injuries to the head, and initial media speculation suggested that he had died as a result of his injuries. However, an investigation into Lashkarava's death determined that he had died from a drug overdose and had been released from a hospital in stable condition.

The counter-protesters proceeded to successfully tear down and burn the Pride flag hanging outside the headquarters of Tbilisi Pride office's balcony. The clashes which broke out between media representatives and counter-protests resulted in 53 journalists reporting the events live being injured. Later during the day, it was reported that Jacek Kolankiewicz, a 49-year-old male Polish tourist was stabbed multiple times in the chest. Media reported that the attack supposedly happened on the grounds of homophobia, as eyewitnesses believe it was motivated by his long hair, tattoos and an earring. He was moved to the hospital in critical condition, from which he later recovered. The relatives of the attacker stated that he was mentally ill and stabbed a foreign citizen without a motive.

At about 3:00 p.m. Tbilisi Pride has announced via Facebook that the March for Dignity has been cancelled. The counter-protesters started celebrating after the news of cancellation were announced by performing traditional Georgian dances on the Rustaveli Avenue.

Reactions
The President of Georgia, Salome Zurabishvili has visited the media representatives at the hospital, expressing her solidarity. Embassies of Austria, Bulgaria, Estonia, the European Union Monitoring Mission, Finland, France, Germany, Greece, Ireland, Israel, Italy, Latvia, Lithuania, the Netherlands, Norway, Spain, Sweden, United Kingdom, UN representation in Georgia, the United States and the EU Delegation in Georgia have expressed their support for Tbilisi Pride and media representatives.

Some critics have claimed that the government responded to the events with inadequate law enforcement measures and attributed it to the government's "uneasy relations with the opposition media", claiming that the violence against journalists happened with their tacit consent. Moreover, some have further developed a theory that the events on July 5 were part of "Georgian Dream's anti-media crusade", suggesting that the violence at the counter-protests was pre-planned by the ruling party to "scare" the "free media".

Nino Lomjaria, the Public Defender of Georgia decried PM Gharibashvili's rhetoric about the protests. Furthermore, during the meeting with the President Zurabishvili she stressed that the "offenders should be persecuted for organized group violence".

In the aftermath of Lekso Lashkarava's death and subsequent funeral, 4 private Georgian TV channels (Mtavari Arkhi, TV Pirveli, Formula TV and Kavkasia) stopped broadcasting in protest for 24 hours, starting from 7 AM of 14 July. They reiterated their demands that the PM Gharibashvili must immediately claim the responsibility and resign from his post.

Russian perennial traditionalist philosopher Aleksandr Dugin, who was known for being a frequent guest of Alt-Info, commented on the ongoing events: "Georgians by their heroic action are changing the world balance - touching the scale of our side". He noted that his Italian friends told him that Italian traditional aristocracy inspired by "Georgian orthodox defenders of human dignity" started to convert to Orthodoxy, which they saw as a more authentic continuation of Tradition.

Protest response
On July 6 Zurab Girchi Zaparidze, a libertarian politician and head of Girchi - More Freedom party, who recently split from the New Political Center - Girchi following the child porn scandal, went live on Facebook, calling counter-protesters on July 5 "dickheads" and announcing the rally against those groups. Some opposition parties responded to Japaridze's initiative and gathered to a protest in front of the Georgian Parliament, where they unfurled the Rainbow Flag in front of the cross erected a day before. The counter-protests were organized in response, and by the late evening, the counter-protesters reclaimed the scene. The groups headed by Zurab Makharadze proceeded to once again tear down and burn the European Union flag. A day later, Speaker of the Georgian Parliament visited the location and raised the EU flag on the building once again, stating that its removal was unacceptable.

After the passing away of Lekso Lashkarava, a new protest was announced on 11 July, demanding that the Prime Minister Gharibashvili and his government take responsibility for the events and resign. The protesters requested immediate resignation of the Prime Minister of Georgia Irakli Gharibashvili and the Minister of Internal Affairs of Georgia Vakhtang Gomelauri and launching criminal investigation against "organizers of violence". Basil Kobakhidze, a former press secretary of the Georgian Orthodox Church who was suspended for insulting and mocking at the Church and the priests, on Mtavari Arkhi, a TV company which also joined the protests, demanded jailing of the 88 years old Georgian Patriarch, bishop Shio Mujiri and other priests along with Irakli Gharibashvili because they supposedly encouraged violence.

On 12 July, PM Gharibashvili categorically ruled out that he would resign. He dismissed the demands of protesters as "anti-state, anti-church and anti-national", and perpetuated claims that the "radical opposition" was guilty of a widespread conspiracy to exploit the pride parade for their political aims by turning it into anti-government protests and creating chaos, citing involvement of the Shame Movement in the March of Dignity as an evidence. The PM also stated that 95% of the Georgian population opposes the Pride parade and that he was obliged to obey them. On top of that, the PM said that "the only parade I know, that will be held in our country, is that of our army" and proclaimed that "minorities will no longer decide the fate of the majority in this country".

On the evening of 12 July, after having protested at the Parliament Building first, the demonstrators gathered around the Georgian Dream headquarters. 12 protesters were detained on the spot, including Irakli Absandze, a prominent journalist of Georgian Public Broadcasting, a state controlled media. The arrest happened after the protesters hurled eggs towards the building and tried to use spray red paint to signify the blood.

Arrests
In total, the government arrested 102 people for participating in these riots in a variety of forms; 68 of these were released on parole, with the rest being left in custody, and the government continued to make additional arrests.

Death of Lekso Laskarava 
On 11 July the journalist of TV Pirveli Lekso Lashkarava was found dead in his house. It was earlier reported that Lashkarava was one of the journalist who was assaulted by the protesters on 5 July. Lashkarava sustained serious injuries to the head, including fractured facial bones and heavy bruising. The death of the journalist spurred public speculation around the cause, with some outlets blaming protestors. On 12 July at the briefing held by the Ministry of Internal Affairs director of the Central Criminal Police Department Mamuka Chelidze stated that the chemical examination has found various drugs in the body of Lashkarava, including morphine, codeine, tetrahydrocannabinol, pentin and monoacetylmorphine. Further forensic medical examination was planned, and an autopsy was made public in December 2021. The autopsy determined that, although there was a concussion and a hemorrhage in the left eyeball along with numerous contusions, they were not the cause of death. Lashkrava died of “acute cardiovascular and respiratory failure developed as a result of intoxication with the drug heroin”. Traces of morphine and another opioid were also found.

On 11 July, commentators on the conservative media platform Alt-Info claimed that the death of Lekso Lashkarava might have been pre-planned by liberal groups to use him as a "sacred victim" and further anti-government riots and colour revolution. Several days later, conservative political figure Levan Vasadze accused the US Ambassador Kelly Degnan of being responsible for the death of Lashkarava.  Nika Gvaramia, director of the Mtavari Arkhi suggested that the report could not be trusted because the government is supposedly trying to shift the blame from the groups involved in the violence against the journalists on 5 July.

See also

LGBT rights in Georgia
2013 Tbilisi anti-homophobia rally protests

References

2021 in Georgia (country)
2021 in LGBT history
2021 riots
2020s in Tbilisi
LGBT in Georgia (country)
LGBT-related riots
Protests in Georgia (country)
July 2021 events in Europe
July 2021 events in Asia
2021 in politics
2021 crimes in Georgia (country)
2021 murders in Georgia (country)